Banned gymnastic skills are gymnastics moves which are prohibited to perform, mostly due to safety concerns for the performing athletes.

Artistic gymnastics

Women 
Official regulation from the International Gymnastics Federation states in its Code of Points for Women, Section 14 Table of elements:

Following elements are prohibited for performance:
 VT – vaults with sideward take-off or landing.
 UB – salto & DMT with take-off from two feet.
 BB – dance elements with cross sit landing on BB.
 FX – acro elements with sideward take off and/or landing into roll.

The following gymnastics skills are banned by at least some gymnastics associations :
 Korbut flip
 Thomas salto
 Roll-out

The following gymnastics skills have reduced score due to safety concerns :
 the Biles
 Yurchenko double pike

Men 
For males, the 2022-24 Code of Points Men's Artistic Gymnastics states the vault is invalid if the following moves are done: 
 salto in the first flight phase
 straddled legs in the second flight phase

A series of skills are also prohibited for juniors athletes.

Tumbling

Quadruple tumbling, for youth athletes

See also 

 Code of Points (artistic gymnastics)

Sources

References 

Gymnastics elements
Sports rules and regulations